= Yiwen Li =

Yiwen Li (Chinese: 李翼文; born June 15, 1949) is the current chairman of Lion Pencil Corporation and vice president of Taiwan Rotary Clubs Association.

Li studied civil engineering in National Taiwan University, and after graduation worked in Lion Pencil Corporation which was founded by his father. Li attended National Chengchi University for two years in his forties and graduated from Tulane University with a degree in EMBA in his fifties. Besides his work experience, Li is active in volunteer activities, such as Taiwan Rotary Clubs Association and Make-A-Wish Foundation.
